Porsgrund Porcelain Factory (Porsgrunds Porselænsfabrik, abbreviated PP) is a porcelain flatware company located at Porsgrunn in Telemark county, Norway.

History
The company's production plant is a popular tourist attraction. The company was founded by Johan Jeremiassen in 1885 and has produced designs by Norwegian artists such as Ferdinand Finne, Theodor Kittelsen, Frans Widerberg and Odd Nerdrum.

Since 1996 the factory has been owned by the Atle Brynestad company CG Holding AS.  In contrast to its prosperous history, Porsgrund  has since experienced a financial decline. After years of uncertain future, adjustments have been made to increase cost efficiency, by considerable restructuring to the production and sales processes.

Gallery

References

Other sources
Bøe, Alf (1967) Porsgrunds porselænsfabrik : bedrift og produksjon gjennom åtti år, 1885-1965  (Oslo: Porsgrunds Porselænsfabrik)
Polak, Ada (2000) Gammelt porsgrund porselen (Oslo: C. Huitfeldt Forlag )

External links
Porsgrund website

Porcelain manufacturing companies in Europe

Eating utensils
Porcelain
Buildings and structures in Porsgrunn
Norwegian brands